Rosa Lindstedt (born 24 January 1988) is a Finnish ice hockey player and member of the Finnish national ice hockey team, currently serving as captain of Brynäs IF Dam in the Swedish Women's Hockey League (SDHL). She won bronze medals at the 2010 Winter Olympics and 2018 Winter Olympics, a silver medal at the 2019 IIHF Women's World Championship and bronze medals at the IIHF Women's World Championships in 2015, 2017, and 2021, and a bronze medal at the 2010 Four Nations Cup in St. John's, Newfoundland and Labrador.

Playing career
Her senior club career began at age fourteen with the women's representative team of the Ylöjärven Ilves (Y-Ilves) in the 2002–03 season of the Naisten SM-sarja (renamed Naisten Liiga in 2017), the premier women's ice hockey league in her native Finland. In the Naisten SM-sarja, she went on to play with Tappara Naiset (2003–2007), Tampereen Ilves Naiset (2007–2012), and JYP Jyväskylä Naiset (2012–2016), twice winning the Finnish Championship, with Ilves in 2010 and JYP in 2016.

Lindstedt relocated to the SDHL in the 2016–17 season, signing with HV71 Dam. She played with HV71 for four seasons, serving as an alternate captain in the 2017–18 and 2019–20 seasons. She joined Brynäs IF ahead of the 2020–21 SDHL season and was named captain the following season.

Statistics

References

External links

 
 

1988 births
Living people
Finnish expatriate ice hockey players in Sweden
Finnish women's ice hockey defencemen
Brynäs IF Dam players
HV71 Dam players
JYP Jyväskylä Naiset players
Ilves Naiset players
Ice hockey players at the 2010 Winter Olympics
Ice hockey players at the 2014 Winter Olympics
Ice hockey players at the 2018 Winter Olympics
Medalists at the 2010 Winter Olympics
Medalists at the 2018 Winter Olympics
Olympic bronze medalists for Finland
Olympic ice hockey players of Finland
Olympic medalists in ice hockey
People from Ylöjärvi
Sportspeople from Pirkanmaa
Tappara Naiset players